William H. Spottiswoode  HFRSE LLD (11 January 1825 – 27 June 1883) was an English mathematician, physicist and partner in the printing and publishing firm Eyre & Spottiswoode. He was president of the Royal Society from 1878 to 1883.

Biography

Early life
Spottiswoode was born in London on 11 January 1825, the son of Andrew Spottiswoode and his wife, Mary Longman. His father was descended from an ancient Scottish family, represented Colchester in parliament for some years, and in 1831 became junior partner in the firm of Eyre & Spottiswoode, printers.

William was educated at Laleham Lea School, Eton College, and Harrow School. He then studied Mathematics and Physics at Balliol College, Oxford. His talent for science showed itself while he was still a schoolboy, and indeed his removal from Eton to Harrow is said to have been occasioned by an accidental explosion which occurred whilst he was performing an experiment for his own amusement. At Harrow he obtained a Lyon scholarship in 1842, and at Oxford in 1845 a first-class in mathematics, in 1846 the junior and in 1847 the senior university mathematical scholarship.

Family
On 27 November 1861 at Bexley in Kent, he married Elisa ("Lise") Taylor Arbuthnot, daughter of William Urquhart Arbuthnot (grandson of Sir William Arbuthnot, 1st Baronet).

Their children included William Hugh Spottiswoode (1864–1915) and Cyril Andrew Spottiswoode (1867–1915).

Career
In 1846 he left Oxford to take his father's place in the business, in which he was engaged until his death. In 1847 he issued five pamphlets entitled Meditationes analyticae. This was his first publication of original mathematical work, and from this time scarcely a year passed in which he did not give to the world further mathematical research.

In 1856 Spottiswoode travelled in eastern Russia, and in 1860 in Croatia and Hungary; of the former expedition he has left a record, A Tarantasse Journey through Eastern Russia in the Autumn of 1856 (London, 1857).

In 1870 he was elected president of the London Mathematical Society. In 1871 he began to turn his attention to experimental physics, his earlier researches bearing upon the light polarization and his later work upon the electrical discharge in rarefied gases. He wrote a popular treatise on the former subject for the Nature Series in 1874. In 1878 he was elected president of the British Association and in the same year president of the Royal Society, of which he had been a fellow since 1853.

He died in London of typhoid fever on 27 June 1883 and was buried in the south transept of Westminster Abbey.

As a mathematician, he occupied himself with many branches of his favorite science, more especially with higher algebra, including the theory of determinants, with the general calculus of symbols, and with the application of analysis to geometry and mechanics.

The following brief review of his mathematical work is quoted from the obituary notice which appeared in the Proceedings of tile Royal Society (xxxviii. 34):

 The interesting series of communications on the contact of curves and surfaces which are contained in the Philosophical Transactions of 1862 and subsequent years would alone account for the high rank he obtained as a mathematician. – – – The mastery which he had obtained over the mathematical symbols was so complete that he never shrank from the use of expressions, however complicated nay, the more complicated they were the more he seemed to revel in them provided they did not sin against the ruling spirit of all his work symmetry. To a mind imbued with the love of mathematical symmetry, the study of determinants had naturally every attraction. In 1851 Mr. Spottiswoode published in the form of a pamphlet an account of some elementary theorems on the subject. This had fallen out of print, permission was sought by the editor of Crelle's Journal to reproduce it in the pages of that journal. Mr. Spottiswoode granted the request and undertook to revise his work. The subject had, however, been so extensively developed in the interim that it proved necessary not merely to revise it but entirely to rewrite the work, which became a memoir of 116 pages. To this, the first elementary treatise on determinants, much of the rapid development of the subject is due. The effect of the study on Mr. Spottiswoode's own methods was most pronounced; there is scarcely a page of his mathematical writings that does not bristle with determinants. His papers, numbering over 100, were published principally in the Philosophical Transactions, Proceedings of the Royal Society, Quarterly Journal of Mathematics, Proceedings of the London Mathematical Society and Crelle's Journal, and one or two in the Comptes rendus of the Paris Academy; a list of them, arranged according to the several journals in which they originally appeared, with short notes upon the less familiar memoirs, is given in Nature, xxvii, 599.

Publications 
 Elementary Theorems Relating to Determinants (London: Longman, Brown, Green, & Longman, 1851) (Alternate URL)
 A tarantasse journey through eastern Russia in the autumn of 1856
Description of a Large Induction-coil The London, Edinburgh, and Dublin Philosophical Magazine, Vol. 3, No. 15, Jan 1877, p. 30

See also
 List of presidents of the Royal Society

References

1825 births
1883 deaths
19th-century English mathematicians
People educated at Eton College
People educated at Harrow School
Fellows of the Royal Society
Presidents of the Royal Society
Alumni of Balliol College, Oxford
English physicists
19th-century British physicists
Burials at Westminster Abbey
William